Lincoln Towers is an apartment complex on the Upper West Side of the New York City borough of Manhattan that consists of six buildings with eight addresses on a  campus.

Location and description
It is bounded on the south by West 66th Street, on the west by Freedom Place, on the north by West 70th Street, and on the east by Amsterdam Avenue.  Each building has a West End Avenue address, although one of the Lincoln Towers buildings has its entrance on West 66th Street, another on West 70th Street, and another is closer to Amsterdam Avenue than West End Avenue.  Some buildings have 28 floors and some have 29 floors and between 15 and 20 apartments per floor.  Lincoln Towers houses so many people that some buildings are their own polling place.  The ground floor of each building is primarily occupied by professional offices and other small businesses; the upper floors are residential.

Features 
Within Lincoln Towers there is an outreach program, "Project Open," that supports the elderly with assistance from social workers, shopping services, art classes and educational trips.  The private parks, schools, the general appeal of the Upper West Side and proximity of the buildings to Lincoln Center have made the complex desirable to families ranging from singles and young families to empty nesters and retirees. The complex houses a large private outdoor space on the far west side of the property containing a floor hockey court, basketball courts, two playgrounds, and green grass for its tenants.  There are other large park-like expanses between and behind the buildings on the east side of West End Avenue.

History
Lincoln Towers is part of the massive Lincoln Square urban redevelopment of the old San Juan Hill district of Manhattan that took place in the 1960s and saw the razing of a large area of what were deemed slums by development officials.  Researchers at Columbia University recently completed an architectural history of the Lincoln Square redevelopment project.

The development was converted from rental apartments to a complex condominium/co-op structure in 1987.  Each building is an independent condominium comprising the residences, the professional units, and the underground garage.  The residential portion of each building is, in turn, a co-op.  Each of the buildings, comprising eight addresses, is a member of the Lincoln Towers Community Association, an umbrella organization responsible for the maintenance of the grounds and provision of security on the large, parklike campus.

References 

Residential buildings in Manhattan
Condominiums and housing cooperatives in Manhattan
West End Avenue
Upper West Side